Cmax may refer to:
 Customatix, a footwear company
 C Max, a maximum security prison in South Africa
 Ford C-MAX, a model of car
 Cmax (pharmacology), the maximum concentration of a drug in the body after dosing.
 CMAX, a crisis indicator designed by Patel and Sarkar 
 CMAX, a bus rapid transit service in Columbus, Ohio, operated by Central Ohio Transit Authority